Abacetus pintori is a species of ground beetle in the subfamily Pterostichinae. It was described by Straneo in 1940 and is found in Ethiopia and Tanzania.

References

pintori
Beetles described in 1940
Insects of East Africa